Bacdafucup is the debut album by American hip hop group Onyx, released on March 30, 1993 by JMJ Records, Rush Associated Labels and Chaos Recordings. The album was produced by Chyskillz, Jam Master Jay and Kool Tee.

Bacdafucup peaked at number 17 on the US Billboard 200, and number 8 on the Top R&B/Hip Hop Albums chart. The album was certified Platinum by the RIAA on October 25, 1993. In 1994, the album was nominated as "Rap/Hip-Hop New Artist" on American Music Awards of 1994 and won "Best Rap Album" on 1994 Soul Train Music Awards.

The album features three of the Billboard singles "Throw Ya Gunz", "Slam" and "Shifftee". The first single, "Throw Ya Gunz", became a crossover radio hit. Their breakout single, "Slam", which received heavy airplay on both radio and television (MTV and BET), leading the song to reach #4 on the Billboard Hot 100, and get Platinum on August 10, 1993.

Background 
Fredro Starr, Big DS and Suave (also known as Sonny Seeza) met Jam Master Jay in a traffic jam at The Jones Beach GreekFest Festival on July 13, 1991. Jay gave them about two months to get a demo, but Suave and Big DS didn't make it to the studio because they were stranded in Connecticut. So Jeff Harris, the manager of Onyx, asked Fredro to come to the studio with his cousin, Kirk Jones, who would join the group and be known as a group member as "Sticky Fingaz" who at the time was doing a solo career under the name Trop and working in the barbershop making a thousand dollars a week cutting high school. Fredro and Sticky Fingaz made two records, "Stik 'N' Muve" and "Exercise".
"...When we went to the studio we made two records. One was called 'Stick and Move' and the other was called 'Exercise'. And they both were crazy! When Jay heard the songs he was like, 'Yo, I love the group'." Jam Master Jay liked these songs and that's how Sticky joined the group, because Jay said, “If Sticky ain't in the group, it ain't no group!”. Jay signed the group to his label, JMJ Records, for a single deal, then for an EP deal followed by an album deal because they did 10 songs on a budget of 6 songs.

Recording and production 
In 1991, despite the reproaches from Fredro, the Onyx's music producer, B-Wiz, sold his drum machine SP-12 and went to Baltimore to sell crack, and eventually he was killed in Baltimore. Thus, all Onyx records were lost.
"...When I met Jam Master Jay, I told B-Wiz, who was doin’ his thing, sellin’ drugs, goin’ to Baltimore. I said, “Yo, don’t go down South, I just met Jam Master Jay.” He went down south, he got murdered... When he got murdered, we lost that sound. When we lost that sound, that was the end."

So the group needed a new music producer. In Brian Coleman's book Check the Technique Fredro described how Onyx met their future producer:"...We met Chyskillz on Jamaica Avenue one day. We was buying weed at the weed spot and Chy was chasing my truck down the street, yelling, 'I got beats!' His stuff back then was jazzy, on some Tribe Called Quest shit, but it was hot. I knew he could put beats together right away. We brought him into our zone and made him do some grimy shit."

Chyskillz was picked as the main producer of the album, he produced 16 of 18 songs. The first song that Chyskillz ever did for ONYX was "Nigga Bridges".

Jam Master Jay attended the studios during the recording of absolutely every song and was guided by the group in the process of recording the album, applying his hand as a producer to many tracks. But despite this, he basically let Onyx and Chyskillz do their thing. Sticky says of the late great JMJ: “Jay was very hands-on, one hundred percent. He was always there in the studio with us. We learned everything from him. He was our mentor”.

Jam Master Jay's friend, Kool Tee, also known as a member of rap groups Solo Sounds and The Afros, produced two songs on the album: "Atak Of Da Bal-Hedz" and "Da Nex Niguz".

Jeff Harris was credited as the producer of the three songs on this album: "Blac Vagina Finda", "Nigga Bridges" and "Stik 'N' Muve", but in fact he was just the group's manager since the release of their first single in 1990, and after the release of Onyx's first album, they grew apart.

The recording of the album began in September 1991 and ended in August 1992, when Fredro Starr acting in a movie "Strapped", and from the set he went to the studio to record the album. The album was recorded in 7 different studios in New York.

During the recording of the album, Fredro Starr and Sticky Fingaz were still working at the Nu Tribe Barber Shop on Jamaica Avenue in Queens, New York City until they heard their song "Throw Ya Gunz" on the radio in November 1992.

Fredro drops a very interesting fact about the group's mind state when recording Bacdafucup: "...While we were recording the album, niggas was on LSD the whole time, straight up. We was dropping papers, taking meth tabs, during that whole album. That's just the creative side of making music. We were like Jimi Hendrix. And that's partially what kept our energy going at that high level. We had that battery pack. LSD was our secret weapon. It kept us creative."

Sticky Fingaz credits Bacdafucup with introducing slamdancing, grimy delivery, and bald head fashion to hip-hop.

Conception of album title 
The title track, "Bacdafucup", was one of the first songs Onyx made, at first it was just a skit, from which they made an intro and filmed a video for it. Then they made a complete song, "Onyx Is Here". Once they did this song, she gave them direction, she described what they was feeling: the whole industry gotta back the fuck up". "...Bacdafucup was probably like one of the first joints we made, it turned out to be like a skit at first, then we did an intro and video to it. Then we did this song but once we did that song, that kind of like gave us our direction, it kind of described what we was feeling. The whole industry gotta back the fuck up. Das EFX gotta back the fuck up, Naughty By Nature gotta back the fuck up, Cypress Hill gotta back the fuck up"

Spelling of "Bacdafucup" as well as "United States Ghetto" was made up by Suave (also known as Sonny Seeza).

In 2016, FreshPaintNYC revisiting the place of filming "Bacdafucup": Shinbone Alley south, NoHo, Manhattan, NYC.

Lyrics 
Every song on Bacdafucup explains an aspect of life for these self-proclaimed Afficial Nastee Niguz. The first single, "Throw Ya Gunz", signifies the Jamaican tradition of a gun salute as a show of respect to the men on the mic ("buc buc like ya just don't care").

"USG", standing for United States Ghetto, stresses their belief that no matter what city you go to, you'll find all ghettos in this country are similar. Onyx talk about the difficulties you face when you live in the ghetto. "...We was talking about the life of "United Statez Ghetto" ("U.S.G."), the hardship of the ghetto. We was speaking for the ghetto. It wasn't just about sticking people up (*robbing people) because that's what people doing in the ghetto, this is one part of this."

On another choice selection, Onyx modifies the old childhood jingle "London Bridge" to "Nigga bridges falling down". "Bichasbootleguz" bluntly describes Onyx's attitude towards the bootleg industry. "Stik 'n Move" is on its way to becoming the stick up kids' national anthem. "Atak of Da Bal-Hedz" pretty much sums up Onyx's method-behind-the-madness - get charged and wreck shit wide open.

Onyx used to change the spelling of words. For example, they had a song called "Phat ('N' All Dat)". Sticky Fingaz invented the word "phat". Russell Simmons took the word and made a clothing line Phat Farm around it.

The album contains a huge amount of profanity, which in itself prevented to playing the songs on the air of various radio stations. However, the song "Slam" sounded literally from everywhere, and a video for it, released 5 days earlier, was broadcast on all cable channels, including BET and MTV.

Album cover 
Sticky Fingaz came up with the idea to use Plexiglas for the album cover and for the video for "Throw Ya Gunz". The group members stood on Plexiglas while the photographer, Gary Spector, took the pictures. Sticky wanted people to see the group from under their shoes.

Singles 
Four singles were released from this album: "Throw Ya Gunz", "Slam", "Shifftee" and "Da Nex Niguz"/"Da Nex DingDong"

The first single, "Throw Ya Gunz" was released, November 27, 1992. The song signifies the Jamaican tradition of a gun salute as a show of respect to the men on the mic. Produced by Chylow Parker, "Throw Ya Gunz" was a success and made it to four Billboard charts, including #1 on the Hot Rap Singles for two weeks. The song achieved even greater success in the UK, where it peaked at #34 on the UK Top 40 in 1993. The song was used as a promo for the 18th season of the American animated sitcom South Park. The song was sampled by more than 50 rap artists including Jeru The Damaja, The Notorious B.I.G., Eminem, Vinnie Paz and A$AP Mob.

The second single, "Slam" was released, May 11, 1993. The song introduced slamdancing into hip-hop. "Slam" was Onyx's breakthrough single, making it to number 4 on the US Billboard Hot 100 and was the group's second straight single to make it to number 1 on the Hot Rap Singles for two weeks. The single was first certified Gold on July 7, 1993, before being certified Platinum on August 10, 1993.  According to Fredro Starr, for all time was sold about 5 million copies of the single. The song was sampled by more than 25 rap artists including GZA, Eminem, PMD, Shaquille O'Neal and Krazy Drayz of Das EFX.

The third single, "Shifftee" was released, August 30, 1993. The song was about being grimy and having that echo into a myriad of life situations. Produced by Chyskillz and Jam Master Jay, "Shifftee" was not as successful as the first two singles, but it still managed to make to five different Billboard charts, peaking at 2 on the Hot Rap Singles. The song was sampled by several rap artists including Mad Skillz, Raekwon, Marco Polo and Noreaga.

The fourth single, "Da Nex Niguz"/"Da Nex DingDong" was released, November 14, 1993. It was accompanied by the release of a video on it.

25th anniversary 
Several different media have written articles dedicated to the 25th anniversary of the release of the album. Sha Be Allah of The Source said "Onyx made their claim to fame with their trademark “mad face”, bald heads and all black everything. Many copycats came after these guys, but their mark on the game is definitely unparalleled. Salute to Fredro, Sticky, Seez, and a big RIP to DS."

Paul Meara of AmbrosiaForHeads said "Leading up to the Bacdafucup‘s March 30 drop was their single “Throw Ya Guns,” released in November 1992. It exemplified ONYX's violent and menacing musical style and became a precursor to perhaps the group's most famous single ever in “Slam,” which eventually would make it all the way to #4 on Billboard's Hot 100 chart."

Vin Rican, the author of the program "Wax Only", which appears on the YouTube channel of LA radio station KPWR, made a mix composed of the drums used to create the album Bacdafucup.

Bronx, NYC videographer Olise Forel made a hip-hop cover animation.

Appearance in movies and on television 
 "Throw Ya Gunz" is featured in Forest Whitaker's 1993 award-winning HBO drama Strapped and in the 2003 video game Def Jam Vendetta.
 "Slam" has been used in movies such as How High and TV shows such as The Cleveland Show, The Tonight Show Starring Jimmy Fallon and Lip Sync Battle as well as numerous commercials, including Nike, ESPN, SoBe and Gatorade. The song was included in the soundtrack for a basketball simulation video game NBA 2K18.
 "Shifftee" appeared in a 1993 New World Order, the movie by World Industries and in a 2011 Stene 6-1, the movie by Stene Productions about skateboarding.
 Five songs from Bacdafucup were included in Forest Whitaker's award-winning HBO drama Strapped: "Throw Ya Gunz", "Bichasniguz", "Nigga Bridges", "Bacdafucup", "Attack of Da Bal-Hedz".
 "Bust Dat Ass" was performed by The Roots on The Tonight Show Starring Jimmy Fallon, when host Jimmy Fallon announced actor Charlie Day on February 14, 2017.
 Eminem appeared in Bacdafucup T-shirt in a 2017 HBO's The Defiant Ones.

Critical response

Bacdafucup was met with generally positive reviews from music critics. Rolling Stone said "...Four baldheads from Queens, N.Y., with Jam Master Jay of Run-D.M.C. co-producing, these menaces crank up monolithic old-school noise, thick as a brick and iceberg cold...." (Rolling Stone magazine Issue 672/3 - December 23, 1993 – January 6, 1994, p. 156).

James Bernard of Entertainment Weekly rated the album an A−, saying "...bare-knuckles hip-hop featuring raw beats and four manic MCs competing for center stage. Onyx's confrontational attitude is so over-the-top that its enthusiasm becomes infectious..." (Entertainment Weekly magazine, Issue No. 165 – April 9, 1993, p. 54).
 
Ghetto Communicator of The Source gave the album three and a half stars out of five, saying "...an extremely dope vision of ugliness that is not for the sensitive....the lyrical chemistry between Sticky Fingaz and Fredro Starr combined with the phat production work of Chyskills (Large Professor's old school homey) and Kool Tee blows shit into orbit and leaves you open for more..." (The Source magazine, Issue #42 - March, 1993, p. 79).

Spin said "...'Move back, muthafuckas! The Onyx is here!'...When the gentlemen of Onyx beseech this of you, it would be within your best interest to heed their desires and indeed withdraw as requested ...Onyx raps it hard like it is..." (Spin magazine June, 1993, p. 18).

Gil Griffin of The Washington Post said that Onyx's lyrics about beat-downs, stickups and gun-toting may be more real than fantasy.

Steve 'Flash' Juon of RapReviews gave the album eight out of ten, saying "For the most part, the plusses on this album are many for fans of hardcore rap, with Sticky Fingaz providing the needed comic relief if and when things get too serious. Other than the six unnecessary skits and a couple of throwaway songs that don't hold up to the high standard the group themselves set, "Bacdafucup" is a solid debut album for Onyx from beginning to finish."

Vic Da Rula of Escobar300 gave the album ten out of ten, saying "...This album is everything that epitomized the East Coast rap scene at the time, Angry, energetic, and in your face. This album is as raw and gritty as it gets. If you don't have it then your missing out!"

Deedub of Time Is Illmatic said "Jam Master Jay insisting that Sticky Fingaz be added to Onyx. There is no question that the self-proclaimed “mad author of anguish” is the chief emcee and carries the lyrical load throughout BacDaFucUp. Led by Sticky, Onyx's animated hyper-energy and horrorgangster rhymes mixed with quality and consistently dark production, make BacDaFucUp an overall solid album and very entertaining listen".

Accolades
In 1998, The Source selected the album as one of 100 Best Albums. In 1999, Ego Trip's editors ranked album in their list Hip Hop's 25 Greatest Albums by Year 1993 in Ego Trip's Book of Rap Lists. In 2005, the album is broken down track-by-track by Onyx in Brian Coleman's book Check the Technique. In 2010, Complex put the album in their list Do It Again: When Rappers Redo Their Album Covers. In 2012, Complex put the album in their list The 50 Best Rap Album Titles Ever. In 2013, Spin put the album in their list The 50 Best Rap Albums From 1993.

Track listing

Leftover tracks 
 "Exercise" (1991)
 "Here 'N' Now" (demo) (1991)
 "Bacup" (radio edit for "Bacdafucup") (1991)
 "United States Ghetto" (The U.S.G.) (Prod. by Chyskillz & Jam Master Jay) (1992)
 "Wake Up Dead, Nigga" (a.k.a. Throw Ya Gunz) (feat. Tek-9) - Version 1 (with different chorus at the beginning) (1992)
 "Wake Up Dead, Nigga" (a.k.a. Throw Ya Gunz) (feat. Tek-9) - Version 2 (1992)
 "Stik 'N' Muve" (original version) (1991)

Personnel 
 Onyx - performer, vocals
 Fredro Starr - performer, vocals
 Sticky Fingaz - performer, vocals
 Suave - performer, vocals
 Big DS - performer, vocals
 Jam Master Jay -  executive producer, producer
 Randy Allen -  executive producer, 
 Chyskillz - producer
 Jeff Harris - producer
 Jeff Trotter - A&R executive /editing / mastering
 Tony Dawsey - mastering

Awards and nominations
In 1994 the album was nominated as "Rap/Hip-Hop New Artist" on American Music Awards of 1994 and won "Best Rap Album" on 1994 Soul Train Music Awards.

Charts

Weekly charts

Year-end charts

Certifications

References

External links 
Bacdafucup at RapGenius
Bacdafucup at Discogs
 
 
 
 
 
 

Onyx (group) albums
1993 debut albums
JMJ Records albums
Columbia Records albums